3-Dehydroshikimic acid is a chemical compound related to shikimic acid. 3-DHS is available in large quantity through engineering of the shikimic acid pathway.

Metabolism 
Biosynthesis: The enzyme 3-dehydroquinate dehydratase uses 3-dehydroquinate to produce 3-dehydroshikimate and H2O.

3-Dehydroshikimate is then reduced to shikimic acid by the enzyme shikimate dehydrogenase, which uses nicotinamide adenine dinucleotide phosphate (NADPH) as a cofactor.

Gallic acid is also formed from 3-dehydroshikimate by the action of the enzyme shikimate dehydrogenase to produce 3,5-didehydroshikimate. This latter compound spontaneously rearranges to gallic acid.

References 

Cyclitols
Cyclohexenes